Catherine Hosmalin  is a French actress.

Personal life
While promoting the movie "Mince Alors", Hosmalin told to Laurent Ruquier in On n'est pas couché : "It's not easy to be big. I would like to lose weight but at the same time it's me, I'm like that. This is my body, I respect him. It [weight] is part of me".

Theater

Filmography

References

External links

Living people
French film actresses
French stage actresses
French television actresses
20th-century French actresses
21st-century French actresses
Year of birth missing (living people)